Rowan McKellar (born 24 May 1994) is a British rower. She won a silver medal in the eight at the 2019 European Rowing Championships. In 2021, she won a European bronze medal in the coxless four in Varese, Italy. McKellar competed in the coxless four at the 2020 Tokyo Olympic Games. She won a gold medal in the coxless four at the 2022 European Rowing Championships and the 2022 World Rowing Championships.

Early life
McKellar graduated from the University of California with a degree in sociology. In 2017 she was a member of 2016 NCAA winning eight.

References

External links

Rowan McKellar at British Rowing

Living people
1994 births
British female rowers
Rowers at the 2020 Summer Olympics
Olympic rowers of Great Britain
Scottish female rowers
20th-century British women
21st-century British women
World Rowing Championships medalists for Great Britain